The Academy of Aerospace Liquid Propulsion Technology or AALPT (in Chinese: 航天推进技术研究院; 航天六院) is a conglomerate of Chinese state-owned enterprises that develops liquid-propellant rocket engines and guidance systems for China's space launchers. It employs about 10,000 people in about ten entities located in the Shaanxi region. AALPT is a subsidiary of the China Aerospace Science and Technology Corporation (CASC).

Activity 
AALPT's main activity is the development of liquid-propellant rocket engines for Chinese space launchers. The YF-77 and YF-100 engines, which will power the Long March 5 family of launchers, are produced in AALPT's facilities. The conglomerate brings together five research centers and four factories.

History 
AALPT was created around 1970 under the base name 067 at Mount Quinling in Shaanxi as part of the industrialization of what was called "the third line", that is, the inland regions of southwestern China. Later, the company concentrated on the regional capital, Xi'an.

See also 
 Long March 5
 Chinese space program
 China Aerospace Science and Technology Corporation (CASC)
 Academy of Aerospace Solid Propulsion Technology (AASPT)

References

External links 
 Official website

Aerospace companies
Research institutes in China
Space program of the People's Republic of China
China, PR